The Kingdom is a 2007 action thriller film directed by Peter Berg and starring Jamie Foxx, Chris Cooper, and Jennifer Garner. The film is set in Saudi Arabia, and is  based on the 1996 bombing of the Khobar housing complex, also on the 2004 Khobar massacre and the two 2003 bombings of four compounds in Riyadh. It was released in the United States on September 28, 2007.

Plot

During a softball game at an American oil company housing compound in Riyadh, Saudi Arabia, al-Qaeda terrorists set off a bomb, killing Americans and Saudis. While one team hijacks a car and shoots residents, a suicide bomber wearing a fake police uniform blows himself up, killing everyone near him. Sergeant Haytham of the Saudi State Police kills the carjackers. The FBI Legal Attaché in Saudi Arabia, Special Agent Fran Manner, calls his US colleague, Special Agent Ronald Fleury, to advise him about the attack. Manner is discussing the situation with DSS Special Agent Rex Burr when an ambulance full of explosives is detonated, killing Manner, Burr, and many others.

At FBI Headquarters in Washington, D.C., Fleury briefs his rapid deployment team on the attack. Although the U.S. Justice Department and the U.S. State Department hinder FBI efforts to investigate the attack, Fleury blackmails the Saudi ambassador into allowing an FBI investigative team into Saudi Arabia. Fleury gathers Special Agent Janet Mayes, a forensic examiner, FBI analyst Adam Leavitt, an intelligence analyst, and Special Agent Grant Sykes, a bomb technician, to go to Saudi Arabia. On arrival they are met by Colonel Faris al-Ghazi, the commander of the Saudi State Police Force providing security at the compound. The investigation is being run by General Al Abdulmalik of the SANG, who does not give Fleury and his team permission to investigate.

The FBI team is invited to the palace of Saudi Prince Ahmed bin Khaled for a dinner. While at the palace, Fleury persuades the Prince that Colonel al-Ghazi is a natural detective and should be allowed to lead the investigation. With this change in leadership, the Americans are allowed hands-on access to the crime scene. While searching for evidence, Sergeant Haytham and Sykes discover the second bomb was detonated in an ambulance. Fleury learns the brother of one of the dead terrorists had access to ambulances and police uniforms. Colonel al-Ghazi orders a special forces team to raid a house, managing to kill a few heavily armed terrorists. Following the raid, the team discovers clues, including photos of the U.S. and other Western embassies in Riyadh. Soon afterward, the U.S. Embassy Deputy Chief of Mission Damon Schmidt notifies Fleury and his team that they have been ordered to return to the United States.

On their way to King Khalid International Airport, their convoy is attacked and incapacitated. Leavitt is dragged out of the wrecked car and kidnapped while Fleury manages to wound one attacker. Al-Ghazi commandeers a civilian vehicle to chase the fourth SUV and the other car holding Leavitt into the dangerous Al-Suwaidi neighborhood of Riyadh. As they pull up, a gunman fires rocket-propelled grenades at them and a fierce firefight starts. Leavitt is tied up inside a complex.

While Sykes and Haytham watch the entrance to the complex, al-Ghazi, Fleury, and Mayes follow a blood trail and kill many gunmen inside. Mayes, separated from the others, finds Leavitt and his attackers, preparing an execution video of Leavitt. She kills the remaining insurgents, and al-Ghazi and the team start to leave. Fleury then realizes there is a trail of blood leading to the back of the apartment. After they enter, Mayes comforts a girl in the apartment and offers her candy. In return, the girl offers Mayes a marble, similar to those embedded in the bodies of some bombing victims. Al-Ghazi sees the grandfather, reaches out with his hand, and offers to help him stand. When the old man gives him his hand, al-Ghazi sees that the man is missing the same fingers as Abu Hamza al-Masri in the terrorist group's many videos and confirms his suspicion that the grandfather is the terrorist leader. Abu Hamza's teenage grandson walks out of the bedroom and shoots al-Ghazi in the neck, then he starts to point his gun at Mayes, prompting Fleury to kill him. Abu Hamza then pulls out an assault rifle and Haytham kills him. As Abu Hamza dies, another grandchild hugs him and Abu Hamza whispers something into his ear to calm the child down. Al-Ghazi dies in Fleury's arms.

At al-Ghazi's house, Fleury and Haytham meet his family. Fleury tells his son that al-Ghazi was his good friend, mirroring a similar scene earlier in the movie wherein he comforted Special Agent Manner's son. Fleury and his team return to the United States, where they are commended by FBI Director James Grace for their outstanding work. Leavitt asked Fleury and Mayes what he had whispered to her to calm her down earlier in the film. The scene cuts to Abu Hamza's daughter asking her own son what his grandfather whispered to him as he was dying. The grandson tells his mother, "Don't fear them, my child. We are going to kill them all," a similar line to what Fleury had whispered to Mayes.

Cast

Production
Prior to filming, director Peter Berg spent two weeks in Saudi Arabia researching the film. Filming began on July 10, 2006, on the west side of the old Maricopa County Courthouse in Phoenix, Arizona. Additional scenes were being filmed concurrently in Mesa, Arizona; the scenes at the American compound were shot at the Polytechnic campus of Arizona State University. In some of the trailer frames, saguaro cacti not native to Saudi Arabia are visible in the background. The scenes in the men's locker room at the beginning of the film were filmed in the men's locker room and detention area of the Gilbert Police Department. The FBI briefing scene was filmed in the media amphitheater/classroom in the same police building. The high speed driving scenes were filmed on Loop 202, which runs through Mesa and Gilbert, just prior to its opening for public use only a few miles from the ASU campus.

While shooting on location in Mesa, Berg was involved in a fatal accident that resulted in the death of another member of the production team. The SUV he was riding in collided with a John Deere Gator all-terrain vehicle driven by Nick Papac. Papac died three hours later. On August 8, 2008, Papac's parents Michael Papac and Michele Bell filed a lawsuit against the director, a driver, and the production company. The lawsuit was dropped in 2008. Filming resumed one day after the incident.

On-location filming took place in Abu Dhabi, United Arab Emirates for two weeks in mid-September. Since Universal Pictures does not have an office in the Middle East, the production was facilitated by a local production firm called Filmworks, based in Dubai. Filming also took place at the Emirates Palace hotel in Abu Dhabi.

The film's production cost an estimated $70–72.5 million.

Reception

Critical response
Review aggregator website Rotten Tomatoes reports an approval rating of 51% based on 180 reviews, with a rating average of 5.8/10. The site's critical consensus reads, "While providing several top-notch action scenes, The Kingdom ultimately collapses under the weight of formula and muddled politics." At Metacritic, which assigns a normalized rating to reviews, the film has an average weighted score of 56 out of 100, based on 37 critics, indicating "mixed or average reviews". Audiences polled by CinemaScore gave the film an average grade of "B+" on an A+ to F scale.

Weekly Standard columnist John Podhoretz called the film "perfectly paced" and "remarkably crisp and satisfying", arguing that it evokes the films The Taking of Pelham One Two Three, Dog Day Afternoon, and The New Centurions. The New York Times critic A. O. Scott called it "a slick, brutishly effective genre movie". He also stated that "Just as Rambo offered the fantasy do-over of the aftermath of the Vietnam War, The Kingdom can be seen as a wishful revisionist scenario for the American response to Islamic fundamentalist terrorism." Peter Travers of Rolling Stone gave the film three stars out of four, remarking "Fleury goes John Wayne on their ass." Evan Williams of The Australian called it "an excellent thriller" and stated that it "may be the first Hollywood film to confront Saudi involvement in international terrorism."

New York Post critic Lou Lumenick stated that "Hollywood provides the Islamic world another reason to hate America with The Kingdom," calling it "xenophobic" and "pandering." The A.V. Clubs Scott Tobias gave the movie a C, criticizing the movie's "queasy brand of escapism" by offering the audience the pleasure of "[w]inning imaginary wars" and giving an idealized portrayal of the efficiency of American intelligence. He says the film appeals to the audience's "basest instincts" and that, despite one sympathetic Arab character, the film could be tarred as racist. Lisa Schwarzbaum of Entertainment Weekly accused the film of "treating its audience like cash-dispensing machines". Kenneth Turan of The Los Angeles Times called it "a slick excuse for efficient mayhem that's not half as smart as it would like to be." He added that "the film's thematic similarity to those jingoistic World War II-era 'Yellow Peril' films makes it hard not to feel your humanity being diminished." Scholar Moustafa Bayoumi has critiqued the racialization of Arabs in the film (along with The Siege) and suggested it is representative of an emerging sub-genre he says is defined by "the notion of African-American leadership of the Arab world, intertwined with friendship with it."

Middle Eastern reception
Faisal Abbas, media editor of the London-based international Arabic journal Asharq Al Awsat, wrote on the newspaper's English website that "despite some aspects which might be perceived by some as negative, many might be pleasantly surprised after watching this film, bearing in mind that Arabs have for a long time been among Hollywood's favorite villains." Faisal concluded that "In all cases, the film is definitely action-packed, and perhaps Saudis and Arabs may enjoy it more than Americans, as events are depicted as taking place in the Saudi capital…and it is not every day that you watch a Hollywood-style car chase happening on the streets of Riyadh. For Westerners, the movie might be an interesting "insight" to a culture that is very different to their own."

In a review titled One good Arab for The Guardian, Palestinian writer Sharif Nashashibi argues the film is one in a long tradition of Western works where Arabs are vilified and Americans are portrayed as heroes, only that this time it bothered to add "a token Arab 'good guy'", equating good with pro-American, "to make up for the fact that the rest of the Arab characters are bad." All other Arab characters in the movie, he says, "are portrayed negatively - from the brutal, hate-filled, anti-western, religiously fanatical terrorists, to the inept, corrupt, heavy-handed, secretive and frustratingly bureaucratic Saudi authorities", as opposed to the "humanity, grief, compassion, determination, ability and patriotism of most of the American characters". He concludes that "The Kingdom perpetuates negative stereotypes for a quick buck and an adrenaline rush, at a time in the world where breeding such ignorance and prejudice has proven catastrophic." He also took issue with what he perceived to be star Jamie Foxx's anti-Arab comments to Jon Stewart on the Daily Show, despite being "treated 'like royalty' in the United Arab Emirates" during the shooting.

Box office performance
The Kingdom grossed $47.5 million in the United States and $39 million in other territories for a worldwide gross of $86.6 million.

The film grossed $17.1 million in 2,733 theatres in the United States and Canada in its opening weekend, ranking #2 at the box office. It also grossed £919,537 in the United Kingdom, about $1.9 million.

See also

 Insurgency in Saudi Arabia
 Counter-terrorism
 War on terror

References

External links
 
 
 

 Article about the banning of "The Kingdom" from Babylon & Beyond, the Los Angeles Times' Middle East blog

2007 films
American political thriller films
2000s Arabic-language films
2000s English-language films
Films set in Saudi Arabia
Films shot in Arizona
American political drama films
Relativity Media films
Universal Pictures films
Films about the Federal Bureau of Investigation
Films directed by Peter Berg
Films about terrorism
Films about jihadism
2000s action drama films
Films scored by Danny Elfman
Films produced by Michael Mann
Films produced by Scott Stuber
Films with screenplays by Matthew Michael Carnahan
Films shot in Abu Dhabi
2007 drama films
Islamic terrorism in fiction
2007 multilingual films
American multilingual films
2000s American films